Richard Nelson is the name of:
 Richard Nelson (author) (1941–2019), anthropologist and writer
 Richard H. Nelson (fl. 1903–1929), Episcopal bishop in America
 Richard Nelson (lighting designer) (1938–1996), American lighting designer
 Richard Nelson (playwright) (born 1950), American playwright and librettist
 Richard A. Nelson (born 1941), vice admiral  and surgeon general in the United States Navy
 Richard D. Nelson (born 1945), American Old Testament scholar
 Richard R. Nelson (born 1930), American professor of economics at Columbia University
 Richard Christian Nelson (born 1961), American artist and musician
 Anthony Nelson (politician) (Richard Anthony Nelson, born 1948), former British Conservative politician
 Richard Nelson, a fictional character in the film Poseidon
 Ricky Nelson (1940–1985), American singer
 Ricky Nelson (baseball) (1959-2021), former Major League Baseball outfielder
 Rick Nelson (politician) (born 1954), member of the Kentucky House of Representatives
 Rick "The Stick" Nelson, one of the characters of Glee
 Rick Nelson, contestant on Survivor: South Pacific (2011)

See also
 Richard Nielsen (disambiguation)
 Richard Nelson Gale (1896–1982), general in the British Army
 Richard Nelson Bolles (1927–2017), former clergyman
 Richard Nelson Frye (1920–2014), U.S. professor of Iranian studies